Bonaventure Maruti (born 10 April 1976, in Nairobi) is a Kenyan football striker who is currently playing for Vollen UL in Norway.

Maruti has played 14 international matches for the Kenyan national team. He is Follo's leading scorer all-time. He surpassed the previous mark of 34 goals for the first team held by Oddmund Vaagsholm. He has scored 36 goals in 66 games overall (as of 09/09/08).

He has helped the two youth players from Kenya to settle into the area. Christian Bwamy and Joanes Muingi both signed by Follo from Kenyan club Mathare United.

In 2011, he joined Fram Larvik. In 2013, he stepped down two tiers to play for Vollen.

Career statistics

References

External links
 
 

1976 births
Living people
Kenyan footballers
Association football forwards
Kenya international footballers
Sportspeople from Nairobi
Gor Mahia F.C. players
Mathare United F.C. players
Flint City Bucks players
Örebro SK players
Bryne FK players
Follo FK players
USL League Two players
Allsvenskan players
Norwegian First Division players
Norwegian Second Division players
Kenyan expatriate footballers
Kenyan expatriate sportspeople in Norway
Kenyan expatriate sportspeople in Sweden
Kenyan expatriate sportspeople in the United States
Expatriate footballers in Norway
Expatriate footballers in Sweden
Expatriate soccer players in the United States